Rhodacarus strenzkei is a species of mite in the family Rhodacaridae. It is found in Europe.

References

Rhodacaridae
Articles created by Qbugbot
Animals described in 1957